István Csizmadia (born December 16, 1944) was a Hungarian sprint canoer who competed from the late 1960s to the mid-1970s. He won a bronze medal in the K-4 1000 m event at the 1968 Summer Olympics in Mexico City.

Csizmadia also won two medals in the K-1 4 x 500 m event at the ICF Canoe Sprint World Championships with a silver in 1973 and a bronze in 1970.

References

Sports-reference.com profile

1944 births
Canoeists at the 1968 Summer Olympics
Hungarian male canoeists
Living people
Olympic canoeists of Hungary
Olympic bronze medalists for Hungary
Olympic medalists in canoeing
ICF Canoe Sprint World Championships medalists in kayak
Medalists at the 1968 Summer Olympics
20th-century Hungarian people